The Lancia Stratos HF (Tipo 829), widely and more simply known as Lancia Stratos, is a rear mid-engined sports car designed for rally racing, made by Italian car manufacturer Lancia. The HF stands for High Fidelity. It was a very successful rally car, winning the World Rally Championship in 1974, 1975 and 1976; and race car winning 1974 Targa Florio, five times the Tour de France Automobile and three editions of Giro d'Italia automobilistico.

History 

Lancia traditionally used the design house Pininfarina and had not used Bertone before. Bertone desired to create an opportunity for a relationship with Lancia and knew that Lancia was looking for a replacement for the aging Fulvia for use in rally sports. Bertone decided to design an eye-catching model to show to Lancia.  Bertone used the running gear of a Fulvia Coupé which belonged to one of his friends and built a running model around it. When Bertone himself appeared at the Lancia factory gates with the Stratos Zero he passed underneath the barrier, to great applause from the Lancia workers. After that Lancia and Bertone agreed to develop a new rally car based on the ideas of Bertone's designer Marcello Gandini. Gandini had already designed the Lamborghini Miura and was working on the Countach at the time.

Lancia presented the Bertone-designed Lancia Stratos HF prototype at the 1971 Turin Motor Show, a year after the announcement of the Stratos Zero concept car. The prototype Stratos HF (Chassis 1240) was fluorescent red in colour and featured a distinctive crescent-shaped wrap-around windshield providing maximum forward visibility with almost no rear visibility. The prototype had three different engines in its early development life: the Lancia Fulvia engine, the Lancia Beta engine and finally, for the 1971 public launch, the mid-mounted Dino Ferrari V6 producing  in road trim. The use of this engine had been planned from the beginning of the project, but Enzo Ferrari was reluctant to sign off the use of this engine in a car he saw as a competitor to his own Dino V6. After the production of the Dino had ended, the "Commendatore" (a popular nickname for Enzo Ferrari) agreed to deliver the engines for the Stratos, upon which Lancia suddenly received 500 units.

The Stratos was a successful rally car during the 1970s and early 1980s. It started a new era in rallying as it was the first car designed from scratch for this kind of competition. The three leading men behind the entire rallying project were Lancia team manager Cesare Fiorio, British racer/engineer Mike Parkes and factory rally driver Sandro Munari, with Bertone's Designer Marcello Gandini taking a personal interest in designing and producing the bodywork. A dedicated calculations engineer from Lancia was tasked with performing calculations on many of the chassis, steering, suspension and engine components: Nicola Materazzi.

Lancia undertook extensive testing with the Stratos and raced the car in several racing events where Group 5 prototypes were allowed during the 1972 and 1973 seasons. Production of the 500 cars required for homologation in Group 4 commenced in 1973 and the Stratos was homologated for the 1974 World Rally Championship season. The Ferrari Dino V6 engine was phased out in 1974, but 500 engines - among the last examples built - were delivered to Lancia. Production ended in 1975, when it was thought that only 492 were made (for the 1976 season, the Group 4 production requirement was reduced to 400 in 24 months). The manufacturer of the car was Bertone in Turin, with final assembly by Lancia at the Chivasso plant. The car was sold as the Lancia Stratos HF Stradale.

The Stratos weighed between 900 and 950 kilograms, depending on configuration. Beginning with the 1978 season the 24 valve heads were banned from group 4 competition by a change to the FIA rules (which would have required additional production of 24-valve cars for re-homologation). Even with this perceived power deficit the Stratos was the car to beat in competition and when it did not suffer an accident or premature transmission failure (of the latter there were many) it had great chances to win.

The car won the 1974, 1975 and 1976 championship titles in the hands of Sandro Munari and Björn Waldegård, and might have gone on to win more had not internal politics within the Fiat group placed rallying responsibility on the Fiat 131 Abarths. As well as victories on the 1975, 1976 and 1977 Monte Carlo Rally, all courtesy of Munari, the Stratos won the event with the private Chardonnet Team as late as 1979.

Without support from Fiat, and despite new regulations that restricted engine power, the car would remain a serious competitor and proved able to beat works cars in several occasions when entered by an experienced private team with a talented driver. The last victory of the Stratos was in 1981, at the Tour de Corse Automobile, another World Rally Championship event, with a victory by longtime Stratos privateer Bernard Darniche.

When the Fiat group favoured the Fiat 131 for rallying, Lancia also built two Group 5 turbocharged 'silhouette' Stratos for closed-track endurance racing. The powertrain and aerodynamics were engineered by Nicola Materazzi based on experience gained with the earlier generation. These cars failed against the Porsche 935s on closed tracks but proved successful in hybrid events. Stratos won a record 5 times the Tour de France Automobile between 1973 and 1980, and also the 1974, 1976 and 1978 Giro d'Italia automobilistico, an Italian counterpart of the Tour de France Automobile. One of the cars was destroyed in Zeltweg, when it caught fire due to overheating problems. The last surviving car would win the Giro d'Italia event again before it was shipped to Japan to compete in the Fuji Speedway based Formula Silhouette series, which was never raced. The car would then be sold and reside in the Matsuda Collection before then being sold to a collector of Stratos', Ernst Hrabalek, who had the largest Lancia Stratos Collection in the world at the time, 11 unique Lancia Stratos cars, including the fluorescent red 1971 factory prototype and the 1977 Safari Rally car. The Stratos also gained limited success in 24 Hours of Le Mans, with a car, driven by Christine Dacremont and Lella Lombardi, finishing 20th in 1976.

Another unique Group 5 car is the Lancia Stratos HF of Austrian Rallycross driver Andy Bentza. The car was first driven by his Memphis teammate Franz Wurz, father of Formula One pilot Alexander Wurz. In 1976 Wurz claimed the first ever European Rallycross title recognised by the FIA with the car, by then still featuring a 2.4 litre engine with first a 12 and later a 24 valve head. For the ERC series of 1977 Wurz was entrusted with an experimental 24 valve engine by Mike Parkes, equipped with a special crankshaft to bring the engine capacity up to just under 3000 cc. For 1978 Bentza took the Stratos over from Wurz, sold his own 2.4 L 12V Stratos to compatriot Reneé Vontsina, and won the GT Division title of the ERC. The one and only 3.0 litre Stratos worldwide was raced by Bentza till the end of 1983. After keeping the car for another 30 years Bentza has sold the Stratos to Alexander Wurz. It was fully restored over a period of almost two years and revealed to the public in May 2016, converted back to its 1976 rallycross specification with Memphis livery.

WRC victories
{|class="wikitable" style="font-size: 95%; "
! No.
! Event
! Season
! Driver
! Co-driver
|-
| 1
|  16º Rallye Sanremo
| 1974
|  Sandro Munari
|  Mario Mannucci
|-
| 2
|  3rd Rally Rideau Lakes
| 1974
|  Sandro Munari
|  Mario Mannucci
|-
| 3
|  18ème Tour de Corse
| 1974
|  Jean-Claude Andruet
|  Michèle Petit
|-
| 4
|  43ème Rallye Automobile de Monte-Carlo
| 1975
|  Sandro Munari
|  Mario Mannucci
|-
| 5
|  25th International Swedish Rally
| 1975
|  Björn Waldegård
|  Hans Thorszelius
|-
| 6
|  17º Rallye Sanremo
| 1975
|  Björn Waldegård
|  Hans Thorszelius
|-
| 7
|  19ème Tour de Corse
| 1975
|  Bernard Darniche
|  Alain Mahé
|-
| 8
|  44ème Rallye Automobile de Monte-Carlo
| 1976
|  Sandro Munari
|  Silvio Maiga
|-
| 9
|  9º Rallye de Portugal Vinho do Porto
| 1976
|  Sandro Munari
|  Silvio Maiga
|-
| 10
|  18º Rallye Sanremo
| 1976
|  Björn Waldegård
|  Hans Thorszelius
|-
| 11
|  20ème Tour de Corse
| 1976
|  Sandro Munari
|  Silvio Maiga
|-
| 12
|  45ème Rallye Automobile de Monte-Carlo
| 1977
|  Sandro Munari
|  Silvio Maiga
|-
| 13
|  20º Rallye Sanremo
| 1978
|  Markku Alén
|  Ilkka Kivimäki
|-
| 14
|  26º RACE Rallye de España
| 1978
|  Tony Carello
| 
|-
| 15
|  47ème Rallye Automobile de Monte-Carlo
| 1979
|  Bernard Darniche
|  Alain Mahé
|-
| 16
|  21º Rallye Sanremo
| 1979
|  Antonio "Tony" Fassina
|  Mauro Mannini
|-
| 17
|  23ème Tour de Corse
| 1979
|  Bernard Darniche
|  Alain Mahé
|-
| 18
|  25ème Tour de Corse
| 1981
|  Bernard Darniche
|  Alain Mahé
|}

Concept cars

Stratos Zero 

The Lancia Stratos Zero (or 0) preceded the Lancia Stratos HF prototype by 12 months and was first shown to the public at the Turin Motor Show in 1970. The futuristic bodywork was designed by Marcello Gandini, head designer at Bertone, and featured a 1.6 L Lancia Fulvia V4 engine. The Lancia Stratos HF Zero was exhibited in Bertone's museum for many years. In 2011, it was sold during an auction in Italy for €761,600. It has been displayed in the exhibit "Sculpture in Motion: Masterpieces of Italian Design" at the Petersen Automotive Museum in Los Angeles. It was at the High Museum of Art in Atlanta at the "Dream Cars" exhibit in 2014, on loan from the XJ Wang Collection of New York City.

The car's body is wedge-shaped and finished in distinctive orange. It is unusually short in length and height, and it shares little with the production version. The Zero appeared in Michael Jackson's 1988 film Moonwalker.

Lancia Sibilo 

In 1978, Bertone created and designed a concept car based on the Stratos called the Sibilo. It was conceived as a futuristic two-seater coupè on the chassis of the Lancia Stratos, the wheelbase of which was lengthened from 2160 to 2280mm. The car's glass surfaces seemed almost integrated into the volumes of the body, which looked like a monolithic sculpture of vigorous and smooth shape.

Stola S81 

In 2000, Marcello Gandini created a modern interpretation of his Lancia Stratos, commissioned by the Stola of Turin. A concept car that is a two-seater coupe built with Ciba LY 5185, a new material considered more useful than traditional clay.

Fenomenon Stratos (2005) 

At the 2005 Geneva Auto Show, a British design firm known as Fenomenon, who had rights to the name, exhibited a retromodern concept version of the Stratos, designed by Chris Hrabalek and following its exhibition at the Frankfurt show, developed by Prodrive. The concept was based around a mid-mounted  V8 engine.

New Stratos 

Following the stalled Fenomenon project, one interested backer funded a one-off model. Commissioned by Michael Stoschek (a keen rally driver and chairman of Brose Group) and his son, Maximilian, the New Stratos was announced in 2010 based on the overall design and concept of the original Stratos and was designed and developed by Pininfarina.

There were reports that given sufficient interest a small production run of up to 25 cars could be possible. Ferrari did not consent to this plan, and forbade its suppliers to support the project. However, on 10 February 2018, Italian coachbuilding firm Manifattura Automobili Torino of Paolo Garella announced that it would be commencing with the production of the originally planned 25 cars.

Replicas
Over the years, the Stratos has inspired several companies to build replicas or kit cars. In the February 1989 edition, the British magazine Car tested a Stratos clone called HF2000 by a company called Transformer.

Since 2007, Hawk Cars Ltd has offered their HF2000/HF3000 series with a choice of Alfa Romeo, Lancia or Ferrari engines, including the original 2.4 litre V6 Dino engine. In a 2009 episode of the British car TV show Top Gear, a Hawk HF3000 was featured.

Lister Bell Automotive produces a Stratos replica called STR. Napiersport Ltd. (a.k.a. SuperStratos) previously produced a model called the Corse. Both are also offered with a choice of (Italian) V6 or V8 engines. Sales or production numbers of the replicas are not reported.

Notes

References

External links 

 High-res pictures of the Lancia Stratos Group 4 car
 Stratos Enthusiasts Club
 Official New Stratos website
 Lancia-Stratos

Lancia vehicles
Stratos
Rear mid-engine, rear-wheel-drive vehicles
Rally cars
Group 4 (racing) cars
Cars introduced in 1972
Bertone vehicles
New Stratos
24 Hours of Le Mans race cars
Winner
World Rally championship-winning cars